White Horse Tavern, also known as the White Horse Inn and Old Swanenburg Farm, is a historic inn and tavern located in East Whiteland Township, Chester County, Pennsylvania. The building consists of two sections. The original section dates to about 1750, and is a two-story, stuccoed stone structure.  The western section was added about 1790.  Located at mile marker 24 on the Old Lancaster Road, it was an overnight stop on the first stage from Philadelphia to Lancaster. General George Washington used the older part as his headquarters following the Battle of Brandywine and during the aborted "Battle of the Clouds." It was also an important stop for Washington's messenger from Valley Forge to Lancaster, when the latter served as the temporary U.S. capital.

It was added to the National Register of Historic Places in 1978.

References

Hotel buildings completed in 1750
Hotel buildings completed in 1790
Hotel buildings on the National Register of Historic Places in Pennsylvania
Buildings and structures in Chester County, Pennsylvania
1750 establishments in Pennsylvania
National Register of Historic Places in Chester County, Pennsylvania